The 2009 Danish Figure Skating Championships was held at the Esbjerg Skøjtehal in Esbjerg from 5 to 7 December 2008. Skaters competed in the disciplines of men's singles and ladies' singles on the levels of senior, junior, novice, and the pre-novice levels of debs, springs, and cubs.

Senior results

Men

Ladies

Junior results

Men

Ladies

Novice results

Boys

 WD = Withdrawn

Girls

Pre-novice results

Debs girls

 WD = Withdrawn

Springs boys

Springs girls

Cubs boys

Cubs girls

External links
 2009 Danish Championships Results
 Dansk Skøjte Union

Danish Figure Skating Championships
2008 in figure skating
Figure Skating Championships